Hammon can refer to:

People
 Becky Hammon (born 1977), American basketball player and coach
 Jupiter Hammon, American poet
 Stratton Hammon, American architect

Places
 Hammon, Oklahoma

Mythology
 Baʿal Hammon, the chief god of Carthage
 Hammon, an alternative spelling of the Egyptian god Amun
 Zeus Hammon and Jupiter Hammon, alternative spellings of Zeus Amun and Jupiter Amun

See also
 Hamon (disambiguation)
 Hammond (disambiguation)